The Leukaemia Foundation is the only national charity in Australia dedicated to assisting those with leukaemia, lymphoma, myeloma, MDS, MPN, Waldenström's macroglobulinaemia, aplastic anaemia, amyloidosis, and related blood-disorders survive and live a better quality of life.

Leukaemia, lymphoma and myeloma are all types of blood cancer and they can develop in anyone, of any age, at any time. Around 41 Australians are diagnosed each and every day. Although improved treatments and care are helping more people survive, a person loses their life to blood cancer every two hours. Blood cancer is the third most common cause of cancer death in Australia, claiming more lives than breast cancer or melanoma.

History

The Leukaemia Foundation was established in Queensland, Australia, in 1975, with the help of hematologist Dr Trevor Olsen and the Holland Park Lions Club. In 1993, the Leukaemia Foundation of Western Australia was formed, followed by the Leukaemia Foundation of New South Wales and South Australian in 1998, then Victoria and Tasmania in 1999. In 2016, the Leukaemia Foundation of Australia and Leukaemia Foundation of Queensland unified to become one national organization. The Leukaemia Foundation now has offices across Australia.

Community commitments

It supports patients and family members by providing free counseling, educational services and accommodation for families who need to relocate while patients receive care.

The Leukaemia Foundation invests millions of dollars per year in blood cancer research aimed at improving treatments and finding a cure. It also supports thousands of Australians every year by providing free services including information, emotional support and advocacy, educational programs to help patients afflicted with blood diseases, safe transport to and from hospital treatment and access to fully furnished, 'home away from home' accommodation for regional families required to relocate to the city for as long as necessary.

One of the Leukaemia Foundation's biggest fundraising events is "World's Greatest Shave", in which participants have their heads shaved in support of leukemia patients.

References

External links 
Leukaemia Foundation 
Cancer organisations based in Australia